Cefups Academy is a private and boarding high school in Nelspruit in Mpumalanga, South Africa founded by Dr Simon Mkhatshwa. The school is known for its use of corporal punishment.

References

External links 

 

Boarding schools in South Africa
Private schools in Mpumalanga
High schools in Mpumalanga
Educational institutions established in 1992
1992 establishments in South Africa